was a province of Japan in the area that is today the northern portion of Fukui Prefecture in the Hokuriku region of Japan. Echizen bordered on Kaga, Wakasa, Hida, and Ōmi Provinces. It was part of Hokurikudō Circuit.

History

Ancient and classical Echizen
 was an ancient province of Japan and is listed as one of the original provinces in the Nihon Shoki. In 507, during a succession crisis, the king of Koshi was chosen to become the 26th emperor of Japan, Emperor Keitai.

In 701 AD, per the reforms of the Taihō Code, Koshi was divided into three separate provinces: Echizen, Etchū, and Echigo. The original Echizen included all of what is now Ishikawa Prefecture. In 718 A.D., four districts of northern Echizen (Hakui District, Noto District (also called Kashima District), Fugeshi District and Suzu District), were separated to form Noto Province. During the Nara period, the poet Nakatomi no Yakamori was exiled to Echizen, where he wrote some of his 40 poems collected in the Man'yōshū, including his love letters to Sanuno Otogami no Otome. Another famous Man'yōshū poet, Ōtomo no Yakamochi, wrote many pieces about Echizen. .

In 823 AD, the two eastern districts of Echizen (Kaga and Enuma) were separated to form Kaga Province. Kaga was thus the last province to be created under the ritsuryō system, and Echizen received its current borders at that time. During the Heian period, the provincial governor of Echizen, Fujiwara no Tametoki, was the father of the celebrated author Murasaki Shikibu. Lady Murasaki left her hometown of Heian-kyō only once in her life, to go to Echizen with her father. She stayed for just over one year, and then returned home to marry Fujiwara no Nobutaka. Her experiences in Echizen are said to have had a major influence on her greatest work, The Tale of Genji, and many place names from Echizen appear in her stories and poems.

Echizen was a strategically important province due to its proximity to Kyoto and Nara and due to its location on the Sea of Japan with contacts to the Asian continent. The province was traditionally famous for its production of washi  paper. A text dated AD 774 mentions the washi made in this area. Echizen is also well known for its ceramics. It is one of the so-called six old kiln sites of Japan (the others being Shigaraki, Bizen, Seto, Tanba, and Tokoname).

The exact location of the provincial capital and Provincial temple of Echizen are unknown, but are believed to have been in what is now the city of  Echizen.

Medieval and pre-modern Echizen
For most of the war between the Northern and Southern Courts, Echizen was under the control of the Ashikaga shogunate. The province was often used as a launching point for the shogunate's attack against the capital, and Echizen became the stage for a number decisive battles of the war.

During most of the Muromachi period, the Shiba clan ruled as shugo of Echizen. The Shiba were displaced by the Asakura clan towards the start of the Sengoku period, who made Ichijōdani their headquarters. Under Asakura Yoshikage, Echizen enjoyed a peace and stability far greater than the rest of Japan during this chaotic period, partly due to his negotiations with the Ikkō-ikki. As a result, Echizen became a refuge for people fleeing the violence to the south.

When Oda Nobunaga invaded Echizen, he defeated the Asakura clan, burned Ichijōdani Castle to the ground and re-established the provincial capital at Echizen-Fūchu, divided among his generals Fuwa Mitsuharu, Sassa Narimasa, and Maeda Toshiie. The province remained in their hands only for a short time, after which the three were granted larger fiefs of their own elsewhere. After the death of Nobunaga, control of Echizen passed on to Shibata Katsuie, who built his castle at Kitanosho Castle in  what is now the city of Fukui. Shibata himself only held Echizen Province for a few years, after which he was defeated by Toyotomi Hideyoshi.

After the Battle of Sekigahara and the establishment of the Tokugawa shogunate, the entire province was awarded by Tokugawa Ieyasu to his second son, Yūki Hideyasu, who became the daimyō of Echizen Domain, from his base at Fukui Castle. During the early years of the Tokugawa shogunate, many nobles and aristocrats moved to Fukui city in hopes to win the favor of Hideyasu, who was widely expected to become the new shōgun. There was great disappointment and resentment when the shogunate passed on to Ieyasu's third son, Tokugawa Hidetada. However, Echizen remained a strategically important military and political base; the Tokugawa shōguns needed loyal daimyō in the provinces surrounding the capital, and Echizen served as a powerful buffer between Kyōto and the Maeda clan of Kaga, who were not among the fudai (hereditary Tokugawa allies).

Much of the province remained in the control of the Matsudaira clan until the Meiji Restoration; however, due to internal conflicts, the kokudaka of Fukui Domain was much reduced from its initial size, and several new domain were created. A large portion of the area of the province also became tenryo territory administered directly by the shogunate.

Meiji period and beyond
During the Bakumatsu period, Matsudaira Shungaku, the 17th daimyō of Fukui Domain plays a major role in national politics, and acted as an intermediary to negotiate the surrender of pro-Tokugawa forces to the Meiji government at the end of the Boshin War. However, with the Meiji restoration, the centre of political power shifted completely from Kyoto to Tokyo, and Echizen increasingly became a backwater. On August 29, 1871, Fukui Prefecture and Tsuruga Prefecture were established. However, on August 21, 1875 Fukui Prefecture was abolished, becoming part of Ishikawa Prefecture, whereas Tsuruga Prefecture became part of Shiga Prefecture. Fukui Prefecture was re-established on February 7, 1881.

Although Echizen no longer existed after 1871 and maps of Japan were reformed after that date At the same time, Echizen continued to exist legally for certain purposes. For example, Echizen is explicitly recognized in treaties in 1894 (a) between Japan and the United States and (b) between Japan and the United Kingdom.

In a border adjustment between Fukui prefecture and Gifu Prefecture on October 15, 1958, the village of Itoshiro in Ōno District was transferred to Gifu.

Historical districts
 Fukui Prefecture
 Asuwa District (足羽郡) - dissolved
 Imadate District (今立郡)
 Nanjō District (南条郡)
 Nyū District (丹生郡)
 Ōno District (大野郡) - dissolved
 Sakai District (坂井郡) - dissolved
 Tsuruga District (敦賀郡) - dissolved
 Yoshida District (吉田郡)

Bakumatsu period domains

Notes

References
 Nussbaum, Louis-Frédéric and Käthe Roth. (2005).  Japan encyclopedia. Cambridge: Harvard University Press. ; OCLC 58053128
 Papinot, Edmond. (1910). Historical and Geographic Dictionary of Japan. Tokyo: Librarie Sansaisha. OCLC 77691250

External links 

 Murdoch's map of provinces, 1903

 
Former provinces of Japan
Hokuriku region
1871 disestablishments in Japan
States and territories disestablished in 1871
History of Fukui Prefecture